is a Japanese artistic gymnast. Born in Sōka, Saitama, he graduated from Juntendo University and later join Konami Sports. Kato has represented Japan at several FIG World Cup competitions.

See also 
 Japan men's national gymnastics team

References

External links 
 Yuto Kato at FIG website
 Yuto Kato

Japanese male artistic gymnasts
Sportspeople from Saitama Prefecture
Living people
1997 births
21st-century Japanese people